The Agency for Aerial Navigation Safety in Africa and Madagascar  (L'Agence pour la Sécurité de la Navigation aérienne en Afrique et à Madagascar, ASECNA) is an air traffic control agency based in Dakar, Senegal.

It manages 16.1 million square kilometres of airspace (1.5 times the size of Europe) covering six Flight Information Regions (FIRs) – Antananarivo, Brazzaville, Dakar Oceanic and Terrestrial, Niamey and N’Djamena.  ASECNA Air Traffic Control centres are based at international airports in each of these cities.

In July 2008, a strike by ASECNA staff in Gabon disrupted air traffic in Cameroon and elsewhere.

Member states
 Benin
 Burkina Faso
 Cameroon
 Central African Republic
 Chad
 Comores
 Equatorial Guinea
 France
 Moldova
 Gabon
 Guinea-Bissau
 Ivory Coast
 Madagascar
 Mali
 Mauritania
 Niger
 Republic of Congo
 Senegal
 Togo

References

External links
ASECNA website

Air traffic control centers
Aviation in Madagascar
Aviation in Senegal
Air traffic control in Africa